Longispora fulva is a bacterium from the genus Longispora which has been isolated from soil from a Zelkova forest from Ohnuma, Fukushima Prefecture, Japan.

References 

Micromonosporaceae
Bacteria described in 2011